Nguyễn Hữu Thắng (born June 22, 1980) is a Vietnamese football midfielder who plays for Vietnamese V.League 1 club TDC Bình Dương. He joined Binh Duong in 2004 after the club was impressed by his performance in SEA Games 22. In 2007, he was invited for a trial in MLS club Los Angeles Galaxy but failed to impress the coaches. Thang came back to Vietnam and joined Vissai Ninh Bình In 2009, he returned to his old club Becamex Bình Dương.

References

1980 births
Living people
Vietnamese footballers
Becamex Binh Duong FC players
V.League 1 players
Vietnam international footballers
Association football midfielders